Music for Men is the fourth studio album by American indie rock band Gossip. It was released on June 19, 2009, by Columbia Records.

Critical reception

Music for Men received generally positive reviews from music critics. At Metacritic, which assigns a normalized rating out of 100 to reviews from mainstream critics, the album has received an average score of 69, based on 26 reviews. The album's production was criticized due to its "loud" sound quality. Albums such as this have been mastered so loud that additional digital distortion is generated during the production of the CD. The trend, known as the loudness war, has become very common on modern rock CDs. In 2010, Music for Men earned Gossip a nomination for Outstanding Music Artist at the 21st GLAAD Media Awards.

Commercial performance
Music for Men was particularly successful in Europe, with sales of 280,000 copies in France alone, where it spent 138 weeks on the chart. In the United States, the album had sold 42,000 copies as of March 2012.

Track listing

Personnel
Credits adapted from the liner notes of Music for Men.

Gossip
 Beth Ditto – vocals
 Hannah Blilie – drums, illustration, percussion
 Brace Paine – art direction, bass, guitar, keyboards, sampler percussion

Additional personnel

 Jeri Lynn Beard – art direction
 Lee Broomfield – photography
 Lenny Castro – percussion
 Greg Fidelman – additional percussion, mixing, recording
 Meghan Foley – art direction
 James Ford – original drum elements 
 Jason Gossman – editing
 Sara Lyn Killion – additional engineering
 Eric Lynn – additional engineering
 Vlado Meller – mastering
 Dana Nielsen – additional recording, editing, saxophone
 Rick Rubin – production
 Mark Santangelo – mastering assistance
 Andrew Scheps – additional mixing

Charts

Weekly charts

Year-end charts

Certifications and sales

References

2009 albums
Albums produced by Rick Rubin
Columbia Records albums
Gossip (band) albums
Albums recorded at Shangri-La (recording studio)